The 1976 Ohio Bobcats football team was an American football team that represented Ohio University in the Mid-American Conference (MAC) during the 1976 NCAA Division I football season. In their 19th season under head coach Bill Hess, the Bobcats compiled a 7–4 record (6–2 against MAC opponents), finished in a tie for third place in the MAC, and outscored all opponents by a combined total of 253 to 175.  They played their home games in Peden Stadium in Athens, Ohio.

The team's statistical leaders included Andy Vetter with 877 passing yards, Arnold Welcher with 1,034 rushing yards, and Phil Buckner with 226 receiving yards.

Schedule

References

Ohio
Ohio Bobcats football seasons
Ohio Bobcats football